Rafael Márquez Esqueda (12 October 1947 – 11 October 2002) was a Mexican professional footballer who played as a defender, and the father of Rafael Márquez Álvarez. He married Rosa Maria Álvarez.

He died of a liver ailment on 10 October 2002 at age 54 in Guadalajara, Jalisco.

References

People from Zamora, Michoacán
Footballers from Michoacán
Mexican footballers
2002 deaths
1947 births
Association football defenders